Halone sobria is a moth of the subfamily Arctiinae. It was described by Francis Walker in 1854. It is found in Australia.

References

 

Lithosiini